Tanay may refer to:

People

Given name
 Tanay Chheda (born 1996), Indian actor
 Tanay Gajjar (born 1973), Indian sound-recording engineer
 Tanay Malhara, 2016 winner of Indian TV series Dance Plus

Surname
 Emanuel Tanay (1928– 2014), American physician and Holocaust survivor
 Bella Tanay, star of the 1979 Hungarian film The Fortress

Places
 Tanay, Côte-d'Or, a commune in Dijon, Côte-d'Or, France
 Tanay, Rizal, a municipality in the Philippines
 Lac de Tanay, a lake in Valais, Switzerland
 Tanay Nature Park, in Izmir, Turkey

See also
 Tannay (disambiguation)